Colbert Leo Quenneville (June 15, 1900 in Saint-Anicet, Quebec – April 9, 1986) was a professional ice hockey player who played 25 games in the National Hockey League with the New York Rangers.

External links

1900 births
1986 deaths
Canadian ice hockey left wingers
Ice hockey people from Quebec
New York Rangers players
People from Montérégie
Canadian expatriate ice hockey players in the United States